The 2008 World Series of Poker was the 39th annual World Series of Poker (WSOP).  Held in Las Vegas, Nevada at the Rio All Suite Hotel and Casino, the series began on May 30th, 2008, and featured 55 poker championships in several variants.  All events but the $10,000 World Championship No Limit Texas hold 'em Main Event, the most prestigious of the WSOP events, ended by July 15th.  As has been the WSOP custom since 1976, each of the event winners received a championship bracelet in addition to that event's prize money, which (after the casino's rake) ranged from $87,929 to $9,119,517.

Highlights of the 2008 series include the selection of Erick Lindgren, who won a bracelet and made three final tables, as recipient of the "Player of the Year Award". Nikolay Evdakov led all players with a record 10 money finishes, and Phil Hellmuth set a WSOP record of 41 career final tables.  The Main Event, which began with 6,844 participants (a level exceeded only by the number of participants at the 2006 event), was suspended once the event was down to the 9 players needed for the final table; the Main Event was resumed on November 9th, and concluded with the heads-up final between Peter Eastgate and Ivan Demidov the next day.  This year was the first in which the Main Event was suspended in this fashion, a change introduced at ESPN's request to allow the TV network to do a same-day Main Event broadcast.  

In a stunning statistical improbability, Justin Phillips knocked out Motoyuki Mabuchi in the Main Event.  Phillips held a Royal Flush, while Mabuchi held quad aces.  One of the broadcasters, Lon McEachern, mentioned on air that the chances of such a showdown occurring were 1:2.7 billion.  Ray Romano had just sat down at the table when this hand played itself out.

Event schedule

2008 records
Nikolay Evdakov set a WSOP record for most cashes at a single World Series with 10. The previous record of 8 was held by 5 players: Chris Ferguson, Phil Hellmuth, Humberto Brenes, Michael Binger, and Chad Brown. Evdakov's achievement also represents the most cashes by a player at one WSOP without reaching a single final table.  Hellmuth, who made two final tables, established a new WSOP career record of 41 final tables, two more than T. J. Cloutier. Scotty Nguyen became the first player to hold both a Main Event and a $50,000 H.O.R.S.E World Championship bracelet.

Several nationals were the first from their country to win bracelets.  Brazilian Alexandre Gomes won Event 48 to become the first South American player to win a WSOP bracelet since Ecuadorian-born Carlos Mortensen won the 2001 Main Event.  Rob Hollink won Event 30, becoming the first Dutch WSOP bracelet winner, and Davidi Kitai won Event 38, becoming the first Belgian player to win a bracelet.

The 2008 Main Event final table took 15 hours and 28 minutes to play, beating the previous record of 14 hours and 2 minutes in 2005.

Main Event

The $10,000 World Championship No Limit Texas Hold 'em Main Event began on July 3 with the first of four starting days. After reaching the final table of nine players on July 14, the final table was delayed until November 9. This change in schedule was made to allow ESPN to broadcast the final table on November 11, shortly after it was played. All final table players were paid ninth place prize money ($900,670) in July, with the remaining prize pool distributed in November. Instead of the Amazon Room, aka "the Poker Room," where all of the events were held, the final table would be held in the Penn and Teller Theatre. On November 9, players played down from nine to two and the winner was decided the next night. The final table consisted of 274 hands in total.

After a large decrease in Main Event participants in 2007 (6358) compared to 2006 (8773), the number increased slightly in 2008 (6844) but was still far from the 2006 number.  As in 2007, the payout structure is flatter than in 2006 and before, with the lowest payouts at $21,230 (more than double the buy-in), as compared to $10,616 in 2006.

The "last woman standing" in the 2008 Main Event was Tiffany Michelle, who finished in 17th place. Celebrities best known from television, music, and professional sports, among other areas, also participated, with two placing in the money.  The list includes:
Out in Day 1: Jason Alexander, Nick Cannon, José Canseco, Jeff Fenech, Larry Flynt, Forrest Griffin, Orel Hershiser, Chuck Liddell, Brad May, Mekhi Phifer, Sam Simon, Jennifer Tilly, David Wells.
Out in Day 2: Paul Azinger, Bruce Buffer, Shannon Elizabeth, Sully Erna, Ray Romano.
Out in Day 3: Andy Griggs, Shane Warne.
Out in Day 4: Steve Davis (389th place, $28,950).
Out in Day 5: Kara Scott (104th place, $41,816).

November Nine

*Career statistics prior to the beginning of the 2008 Main Event

Final table

At the age of 22, Peter Eastgate became the youngest Main Event winner, surpassing Phil Hellmuth who was 24 when he won in 1989 and became the first European to capture the title since Carlos Mortensen won in 2001.

Other notable high finishes
NB: This list is restricted to top 30 finishers with an existing Wikipedia entry.

Performance of past champions
Twenty past WSOP Main Event champions, representing 22 bracelets, participated in the 2008 Main Event.  Two champions from the late 1980s finished in the money: Johnny Chan placed 329th for $32,166, and Phil Hellmuth finished 45th for $154,400.

Notes

World Series of Poker
World Series of Poker